Carlos Rodríguez Mateo (born July 25, 1965) is a Puerto Rican politician, former mayor of Salinas and current senator. Rodríguez is affiliated with the New Progressive Party (PNP) and served as mayor from 2005 to 2013. Started his college career University of Puerto Rico, Río Piedras Campus. In 1984, obtained a bachelor's degree in natural sciences with a concentration in biology. Four years later culminated his doctorate in medicine from Pontificia Universidad Católica Madre y Maestra (PUCMM) in the Dominican Republic. In 1993, he completed a master's degree in public health in the area of medical sciences at the University of Puerto Rico.

He was major of the municipality of Salinas from 2005 to 2013, and was elected as a Senator in 2016. During this term he served as the president of the Government Commission.

References

Living people
Mayors of places in Puerto Rico
Members of the Senate of Puerto Rico
New Progressive Party (Puerto Rico) politicians
People from Salinas, Puerto Rico
Pontificia Universidad Católica Madre y Maestra alumni
University of Puerto Rico alumni
1965 births